Stražgonjca is a settlement in the Municipality of Kidričevo in northeastern Slovenia. It lies northeast of Pragersko on Črnec Creek. The area is part of the traditional region of Styria. It is now included with the rest of the municipality in the Drava Statistical Region.

References

External links
Stražgonjca on Geopedia

Populated places in the Municipality of Kidričevo